Cecília Kethlen Jerônimo de Araújo (born 13 October 1998) is a Brazilian Paralympic swimmer. She represents Brazil in elite international competitions. She represented Brazil at the 2016 and 2020 Summer Paralympics.

Career
Jerônimo de Araújo made her international debut for Brazil at the 2015 Parapan American Games. She won seven medals at the 2019 Parapan American Games, including four gold medals.

She won a gold medal at the 2017 World Para Swimming Championships in the 50 metre freestyle S8 event and a silver medal in the 100 metre freestyle S8 event. She won a silver medal at the 2019 World Para Swimming Championships in the 50 metre freestyle S8 event.

She represented Brazil at the 2016 Summer Paralympics. She again represented Brazil at the 2020 Summer Paralympics in the 50 metre freestyle S8 event and won a silver medal.

References

1998 births
Living people
People from Natal, Rio Grande do Norte
Brazilian female backstroke swimmers
Brazilian female butterfly swimmers
Brazilian female freestyle swimmers
Paralympic swimmers of Brazil
Medalists at the 2019 Parapan American Games
Medalists at the World Para Swimming Championships
Swimmers at the 2016 Summer Paralympics
Swimmers at the 2020 Summer Paralympics
Medalists at the 2020 Summer Paralympics
Paralympic silver medalists for Brazil
Paralympic medalists in swimming
S8-classified Paralympic swimmers
Sportspeople from Rio Grande do Norte
21st-century Brazilian women